Kenora is a federal electoral district in Ontario, Canada, that has been represented in the House of Commons of Canada since 2004.

Of the federal electoral districts located in Ontario it is the largest by area, and the smallest by population. It encompasses most of Kenora District except for the eastern third, and a small section of the northwest corner of Thunder Bay District. It includes many remote First Nations reserves of extreme Northern Ontario. It succeeds the former federal riding of Kenora—Rainy River.

Geography

It consists of the part of the Territorial District of Kenora lying west of a line drawn due north from the northeast corner of the Territorial District of Thunder Bay (Albany River) to Hudson Bay; and the part of the Territorial District of Thunder Bay lying northwest of a line
drawn east from the western limit of the territorial district along the 6th Base Line, north along eastern limit of the townships of Bertrand, McLaurin, Furlonge, Fletcher and Bulmer, and due north to the northern limit of the territorial district.

History

The federal riding was created in 2003 from parts of the Kenora—Rainy River riding. This riding was left unchanged after the 2012 electoral redistribution.

Member of Parliament

This riding has elected the following members of the House of Commons of Canada:

Election results

See also
 List of Canadian federal electoral districts
 Past Canadian electoral districts

References

Notes

External links
Riding history from the Library of Parliament
2011 results from Elections Canada
 Campaign expense data from Elections Canada

Ontario federal electoral districts
Dryden, Ontario
Politics of Kenora
Sioux Lookout
2003 establishments in Ontario
Constituencies established in 2003